Eftichia "Efi" Michailidou  (born 20 September 1977) is a Greek retired football midfielder who played for the  Greece women's national football team. She competed at the 2004 Summer Olympics. At the club level, she played for Kavala 86.

See also
 Greece at the 2004 Summer Olympics

References

External links
 
 

1977 births
Living people
Greek women's footballers
Place of birth missing (living people)
Footballers at the 2004 Summer Olympics
Olympic footballers of Greece
Women's association football midfielders
Greece women's international footballers